Malesherbia tocopillana is a subshrub native to Tocopilla, Antofagasta Chile. It is found in costal deserts at altitudes of 150 - 400 m. It reaches heights of 50 cm, has 25 - 65mm long leaves and simple racemes pink flowers. It is considered a very rare plant, with only 9 live individuals documented, as such, it is classified as endangered.

References 

Eudicots of Chile
tocopillana
Plants described in 1967